THK (Tverskoi Hokkeiny Klub — Tver Hockey Club) was a minor professional ice hockey club in Tver, Russia. It was founded in 1949 and subsequently reestablished in 2009. The team played in the Supreme Hockey League, the second level of Russian ice hockey until 2017.

History
The club was founded as SKA MVO Tver in 1949. They have gone through a number of name changes during their history.

1949 to 1990: SKA MVO Tver
1990 to 1992: Egida Tver
1992 to 1994: Mars Tver
1994 to 1995: Zvezda Tver
1995 to 2004, 2005 to 2017: THK Tver
2004 to 2005: HK MVD-THK Tver

External links
 tver-thk.ru

Ice hockey teams in Russia
Sport in Tver
Ice hockey clubs established in 1949
1949 establishments in Russia
Ice hockey clubs disestablished in 2017
2017 disestablishments in Russia